Lincoln City Hall is the former seat of the Lincoln, Nebraska city government. The hall was built from 1874-1879 as the U.S. Post Office and Court House, designed by the office of the U.S. Treasury Department's architect, Alfred B. Mullett. A new post office and court house was built in 1906 and the property was transferred to the city. It was superseded as city hall in 1969 when the city government moved into the City-County Building. Although Mullett is officially listed as the architect, much of the design work may have been carried out by his assistant, William Appleton Potter, who specialized in the Gothic style.

Description
City Hall is built of brick faced with rough limestone blocks. The exterior is detailed in an austere High Victorian Gothic style, capped by a mansard roof. The interior is similarly finished, with Gothic details in the woodwork. The style was influenced by the work of John Ruskin.

Lincoln City Hall was placed on the National Register of Historic Places on October 15, 1969.

References

External links

City and town halls on the National Register of Historic Places in Nebraska
Gothic Revival architecture in Nebraska
Government buildings completed in 1874
Buildings and structures in Lincoln, Nebraska
Alfred B. Mullett buildings
William Appleton Potter buildings
Historic American Buildings Survey in Nebraska
National Register of Historic Places in Lincoln, Nebraska
City and town halls in Nebraska